Low Life (also known as Raging Years) is a 2004 South Korean action film directed by Im Kwon-taek.

Plot
The life of gangster, Choi Tae-woong is followed through the tumultuous events of the second half of the 20th century in Korea.

Cast
 Cho Seung-woo as Choi Tae-woong
 Kim Min-sun as Park Hye-ok
 Kim Hak-jun as Oh Sang-pil
 Yoo Ha-jun as Park Seung-mun
 Kim Young-hoon
 Tae In-ho as Ddeok Dae's friend.
 Kim Jung-tae as Supplier #1.

Film festivals
It was invited to the 2004 Toronto International Film Festival, and screened in competition at the Hawaii International Film Festival and the 2004 Venice Film Festival.

Awards and nominations

Notes

Sources

External links
 
 

2004 films
2004 action films
2000s crime drama films
South Korean crime action films
South Korean crime drama films
South Korean neo-noir films
Films about organized crime in South Korea
Films directed by Im Kwon-taek
Cinema Service films
2000s Korean-language films
2004 drama films
2000s South Korean films